The Bulgarian football club PFC Cherno More Varna has played several times in two international competitions at the European level: the Intertoto Cup and the Europa League (formerly the UEFA Cup).

Total statistics

Statistics by country

Statistics by competition

UEFA Intertoto Cup

UEFA Cup / UEFA Europa League 

Notes
 2Q: Second qualifying round
 3Q: Third qualifying round
 PO: Play-off round

References

PFC Cherno More Varna
Cherno More